Vince L. Beiser (born July 13, 1965) is an American-Canadian journalist.

Biography 
Vince was born in New York City, United States, to Order of Canada recipient Morton Beiser and Commemorative Medal for the Queen’s Golden Jubilee and  Government of Canada Celebration ’88 Certificate of Merit winner Roberta Lando Beiser. He is the brother of actor Brendan Beiser and of David Beiser, of AYUSA Global Youth Exchange.
 
Beiser lives in Los Angeles, California, with his wife and children.

Career overview 
He studied at the University of California at Berkeley, graduating with highest honors (Summa cum Laude) with a degree in Middle Eastern Studies.

As a Los Angeles-based freelance journalist specializing in criminal justice and other social issues, he was a special projects reporter for The Oakland Tribune, and a senior writer for The Jerusalem Report, Israel's leading news magazine. For publications such as Harper's, Wired, The Los Angeles Times Magazine, The Village Voice, The New Republic, The Nation, and Rolling Stone he has reported from as far away as the Balkans, the Middle East and India.

He is an online contributor to The Huffington Post. He is also the former senior editor of Mother Jones.

For his frequent reporting on capital punishment and death-row issues, Beiser is a regular guest on the BBC, NPR and other radio talk shows.

Beiser appeared at TED talks in July 2019 and his presentation was titled "There's a global sand crisis and no one is talking about it."

Achievements and honours 
Beiser's work has been honored by Investigative Reporters and Editors, the Columbia, Medill and Missouri Graduate Schools of Journalism, the National Mental Health Association, the Association of Alternative Newsweeklies and other institutions.

Works
 The World in a Grain: The Story of Sand and How It Transformed Civilization, Riverhead Books, New York, 2018,

References

External links
Official Website

1965 births
American emigrants to Canada
American male journalists
Living people
UC Berkeley College of Letters and Science alumni
Journalists from New York City